The boules competition at the 2019 Games of the Small States of Europe was held from 28 to 30 May 2019 at the Olympic Park in Budva.

Medal summary

Medal table

Medalists

References 

Boules sports at the Games of the Small States of Europe
2019 Games of the Small States of Europe
2019 in bowls